Conus smoesi is a species of sea snail, a marine gastropod mollusk in the family Conidae, the cone snails, cone shells or cones.

These snails are predatory and venomous. They are capable of "stinging" humans.

Description
The length of the shell attains 20 mm.

Distribution
This marine species of cone snail occurs off the Ceará State, Northeast Brazil

References

 Petuch E.J. & Berschauer D.P. (2016). Six new species of gastropods (Fasciolariidae, Conidae, and Conilithidae) from Brazil. The Festivus. 48(4): 257-266.page(s): 260, figs 2I-L

External links
 

smoesi
Gastropods described in 2016